Henri Blanc (born 3 February 1907, date of death unknown) was a Swiss weightlifter. He competed in the men's lightweight event at the 1936 Summer Olympics.

References

1907 births
Year of death missing
Swiss male weightlifters
Olympic weightlifters of Switzerland
Weightlifters at the 1936 Summer Olympics
Place of birth missing